Modran is a place located in the municipality of Bijeljina in Republika Srpska, Bosnia and Herzegovina.

External links
 Modran's official website  (Serbian)
 FK Modran's official website  (Serbian)

Cities and towns in Republika Srpska
Bijeljina